The Annales Xantenses or Annals of Xanten are a series of annals which adapt and continue the Royal Frankish Annals. Their first editor, Georg Pertz, thought they were perhaps written at the monastery at Xanten, hence their name. However, according to Heinz Löwe, the entries from 790 to around 860 were probably written at Lorsch by Gerward, a royal chaplain. Löwe suggests that the manuscript subsequently passed to Cologne, and around 871 new entries were written there, for the years from 861 onwards. This part of the text is hostile to Archbishop Gunthar of Cologne.

The annals survive in a single twelfth-century manuscript, London, British Library Cotton Tiberius C.XI.

References

Sources
Edition: https://www.dmgh.de/mgh_ss_rer_germ_12/index.htm#page/(1)/mode/1up 
Medieval Sourcebook: Annals of Xanten, 845-853.
Reuter, Timothy (trans.) The Annals of Fulda. (Manchester Medieval series, Ninth-Century Histories, Volume II.) Manchester: Manchester University Press, 1992.

Carolingian Latin historical texts
9th-century Latin books
9th-century Latin writers
Historians from the Carolingian Empire